Henry Brown "Harry" Barkas (21 January 1906 – 1974) was an English professional footballer who played centre forward for Spennymoor United before joining Football League Third Division North side South Shields in 1929, making 21 league appearances and scoring 15 goals. South Shields moved to Gateshead in 1930 and changed their name to Gateshead F.C., where Barkas played 19 league games, scoring 7 goals. In this period he also scored 5 goals in 3 FA Cup games. Barkas then moved to Football League First Division side Liverpool in 1931, making 5 league appearances. He later played non-league football with Jarrow.

Sources

1906 births
1974 deaths
English footballers
Association football forwards
Spennymoor United F.C. players
South Shields F.C. (1889) players
Gateshead F.C. players
Liverpool F.C. players
English Football League players
Jarrow F.C. players
Barkas family